Radio Líder was the flagship station of the AM network of Cadena Melodía, a Colombian radio network. It started in 1947 as Radio Industrial. It would later be renamed to Radio Capital, until 1959 when Liberal party politician Efraín Páez Espitia bought the station and changed its name to Radio Melodía.

In 2012, Cadena Melodía rented sister station Melodía FM Estéreo to Valórem, owner of Caracol TV. Thus, Melodía FM Estéreo moved to the AM band, where Radio Líder was located.

References

External links 
Radio Líder
Live streaming

Radio stations in Colombia
1947 establishments in Colombia
2012 disestablishments in Colombia
Radio stations established in 1947
Radio stations disestablished in 2012
Defunct mass media in Colombia